Bangladesh elects on national level a legislature with one house or chamber. The unicameral Jatiyo Sangshad, meaning national parliament, has 350 members of which 300 members are directly elected through a national election for a five-year term in single-seat constituencies while 50 memberships are reserved for the women who are selected by the ruling party or coalition. The Prime Minister is the head of the government. The president who is the head of the state is elected by the National Parliament. The president of Bangladesh is a ceremonial post and does not exercise any control over the running of the state.

Bangladesh has an unofficial two-party system which has evolved over time since the election of 1991. It means that there are two dominant political parties or coalitions, one headed by Bangladesh Awami League and the other by Bangladesh Nationalist Party, with extreme difficulty for anybody to achieve electoral success under the banner of any other party in terms of achieving a majority.

Historical Overview
The constitution was adopted in 1972 and declared Bangladesh as a parliamentary republic. However, in 1975 executive powers were transferred to the Presidency, reducing the Jatiyo Sangshad and the Prime Minister to legislative powers only. This system was maintained until 1991 when the Twelfth Amendment was passed, returning the state to a parliamentary system. Since 1971, 11 parliamentary elections have been held and three Presidential elections have been held by popular vote.

Parliamentary elections

Electoral system

The Parliament of Bangladesh (Jatiya Sangsad) consists of 350 members elected to five-year terms. Of that number, 300 are elected in single-member territorial constituencies according to the first-past-the-post electoral system. The remaining 50 seats are reserved for women, and are filled on the basis of proportional representation by a vote of the 300 members. The number of reserved seats has been revised over the years, increasing from 30 to 45 under the 8th parliament and 45 to 50 under the 9th parliament.

General elections
Since independence in 1971, 11 general elections have been held in Bangladesh to elect members of the Jatiya Sangsad:

1970
1970 Paskistani general election

The 1970 Pakistani National Assembly election was held on 7 December 1970. The total number of voters were 29,479,386. The number of casting votes was 17,005,163 (57.68%), the valid casting votes was 16,454,278.

1970 East Pakistan Provincial Council election

The 1970 East Pakistan Provincial Council election was held on 17 December 1970. The percentage of casting votes was (57.69%), and the number of reserved women seat was 10.

1973

The 1973 general election was held on 7 March 1973. There were 15 seats reserved for women.

1979

The 1979 general election was held on 18 February 1979. There were 30 seats reserved for women.

1986

The 1986 general election was held on 7 May 1986. There were 30 seats reserved for women.

1988

The 1988 general election was held on 3 March 1988. There were 30 seats reserved for women.

1991

The 1991 general election was held on 13 January 1991. There were 30 seats reserved for women.

1996

Following boycotts by the main opposition party, the Bangladesh Awami League, the Bangladesh Nationalist Party won the uncontested February 1996 general election. However, amidst protests, they were made to cave in to Awami League's original demands, dissolve the parliament, and hold elections under a neutral caretaker government after the enactment of the 13th amendment.

Bangladesh Awami League won the June 1996 general election for the first time since 1973 by forming a coalition government, since they fell 5 seats short of a majority.

2001

BNP won two-thirds majority in the parliament and won the 2001 general election.

2008

Bangladesh Awami League won two-thirds majority in the parliament and won the 2008 general election.

2014

In the 2014 general election the Awami League was declared victors in 127 of the 154 uncontested seats by default on 5 January 2014. Of the remaining uncontested seats, the Jatiya Party led by Rowshan Ershad won 20, the JSD won three, the Workers Party won two and the Jatiya Party (Manju) won one.

As a result of violence and the opposition boycott voter turnout was 22%. Results of 139 seats out of 147 were released, with the Awami League winning 105, the Jatiya Party winning 13, the Workers Party winning four, the JSD winning two and the Tarikat Federation and BNF winning one each. The remaining 8 constituencies election were suspended due to violence and re-election to be held. The newly elected MPs were sworn in on 9 January.

2018

The 2018 general election held on 30 December 2018, voter turnout was 80%. Bangladesh Awami League under the leadership of Prime Minister Sheikh Hasina won their 4th term as the ruling party with 302 seats. The Jatiya Party became the main opposition party with only 26 seats.

Presidential elections 

From independence until constitutional reform in 1991, the President was elected by popular vote, although this only happened on three occasions - 1978, 1981 and 1986.

Following constitutional reform and a return to a parliamentary democracy in 1991, the office of the President has been largely a ceremonial one. The President is elected by a vote in the Jatiya Sangsad. A Presidential term is for five-years, although they remain in office until their successor is elected. Elections under this system have taken place in 1991, 1996, 2001, 2002, 2009, 2013 and 2018.

1978

The 1978 Bangladeshi presidential elections were held on 3 June 1978. They were the first direct elections for the post President, as the post had previously been elected by the Jatiya Sangsad. The result was a victory for Ziaur Rahman, who won 76.6% of the vote. Turnout was 54.3%.

1981

The 1981 Bangladeshi presidential elections were held on 15 November 1981. The result was a victory for the incumbent acting President Abdus Sattar of the Bangladesh Nationalist Party (BNP), who received 65.5% of the vote, beating his principal challenger Kamal Hossain of the Awami League. Voter turnout was 54.3%.

1986

The 1986 Bangladeshi presidential elections were held on 15 October 1986. The result was a victory for incumbent Hussain Muhammad Ershad, who had assumed the office in 1983 following a military coup. Ershad reportedly won 84.1% of the vote with a voter turnout of 54.9%. However the elections were controversial as they were boycotted by all major opposition candidates and there were reports of irregularities.

See also 
 Bangladesh Election Commission
 Electoral calendar
 Electoral system
 List of parliamentary constituencies of Bangladesh

Notes

References

External links 
 Adam Carr's Election Archive
 Bangladeshi Electoral Commission

Elections in Bangladesh
General elections in Bangladesh